Holly and the Italians is the first studio album released by the American singer Holly Beth Vincent as a solo artist, in 1982.

Track listings (American Release)
All songs written by Holly Beth Vincent, except where indicated
Side one
"Honalu" – 3:50
"Dangerously" – 5:47
"Uptown" – 4:58
"Cool Love (Is Spreading Around)" – 4:37
"Just Like Me" – 2:20

Side two
"For What It's Worth" (Stephen Stills) – 3:19 (Buffalo Springfield cover)
"We Danced" – 3:05
"Revenge" – 3:40
"Unoriginal Sin" – 6:10
"Samurai and Courtesan" – 5:21

Track listings (European Release)
Side one
"Honalu" – 3:50
"For What It’s Worth" – 3:19
"Only Boy" – 4:02
"Revenge" – 3:40
"Samurai and Courtesan" – 5:21

Side two
"Cool Love (Is Spreading Around) - 4:37
"Uptown" – 4:58
"We Danced" – 3:05
"Unoriginal Sin" – 6:10
"Just Like Me" – 2:20

Personnel
Holly Beth Vincent – vocals, guitars, additional drums and synthesizer on track 6
Mike Thorne – keyboards, producer
Bobby Valentino – violin, mandolin
Bobby Collins – bass
Kevin Wilkinson – drums

Additional musicians
John Gatchell – trumpet on track 1
Robert Medici – marimba on track 6
Joey Ramone – backing vocals on track 7

Production
Harvey Goldberg – engineer, mixing
Don Wershba, Gareth Jones – assistant engineers
Jack Skinner – mastering at Sterling Sound, New York

References

1982 debut albums
Albums produced by Mike Thorne
Virgin Records albums
Epic Records albums
New wave albums by American artists